Janesville (also known as Lassen) is a census-designated place in Lassen County, California. Janesville is located on the eastern slopes of the Sierra Nevada Mountain range. Its population is 2,461 as of the 2020 census, up from 1,408 from the 2010 census.

The community consists of an elementary school, a park, four churches, two gas stations, a pizza parlor, a coffee shop, a veterinary hospital, a hardware store, a post office, and a few other businesses.

Its ZIP Code is 96114. The community is inside area code 530.

History
Fort Janesville
In 1860, after the First Battle of Pyramid Lake, settlers built a loopholed stockade for protection from an Indian attack that never materialized. The fort, which had a bastion, or block house, in its southwest angle, was less than a mile from the town of Janesville. The site of the fort is now a California Historic Landmark.

In 1864, Janesville lost to Susanville by one vote from becoming the county seat. The Janesville post office opened in 1861, closed for a time in 1864, changed its name to Lassen in 1914, and renamed to Janesville in 1923. The name honors Jane Bankhead, wife of an early settler.

Geography
According to the United States Census Bureau, the CDP has a total area of 13.2 square miles (34.2 km), of which over 99% is land.

Demographics

The 2010 United States Census reported that Janesville had a population of 1,408. The racial makeup of Janesville was 1,283 (91.1%) White, 13 (0.9%) African American, 32 (2.3%) Native American, 11 (0.8%) Asian, 3 (0.2%) Pacific Islander, 27 (1.9%) from other races, and 39 (2.8%) from two or more races. Hispanic or Latino of any race were 118 persons (8.4%).

The Census reported that 1,400 people (99.4% of the population) lived in households, 8 (0.6%) lived in non-institutionalized group quarters, and 0 (0%) were institutionalized.

There were 535 households, out of which 166 (31.0%) had children under the age of 18 living in them, 361 (67.5%) were opposite-sex married couples living together, 32 (6.0%) had a female householder with no husband present, 22 (4.1%) had a male householder with no wife present.  There were 19 (3.6%) unmarried opposite-sex partnerships, and 6 (1.1%) same-sex married couples or partnerships. 96 households (17.9%) were made up of individuals, and 31 (5.8%) had someone living alone who was 65 years of age or older. The average household size was 2.62. There were 415 families (77.6% of all households); the average family size was 2.96.

The population was spread out, with 344 people (24.4%) under the age of 18, 69 people (4.9%) aged 18 to 24, 291 people (20.7%) aged 25 to 44, 508 people (36.1%) aged 45 to 64, and 196 people (13.9%) who were 65 years of age or older. The median age was 45.0 years. For every 100 females, there were 106.1 males. For every 100 females age 18 and over, there were 104.6 males.

The homeowner vacancy rate was 2.5%; the rental vacancy rate was 9.6%.  1,206 people (85.7% of the population) lived in owner-occupied housing units and 194 people (13.8%) lived in rental housing units.

Politics

References

Census-designated places in Lassen County, California
Census-designated places in California